Kenana ibn al-Rabi' also known as Kenana ibn al-Rabi'a and Kenana ibn al-Rabi ibn Abu al-Huqayq, was a Jewish Arab tribal leader of seventh-century Arabia and an opponent of Muhammad. He was a son of the poet al-Rabi ibn Abu al-Huqayq. Ibn al-Rabi' was killed during early Muslim clashes with the Banu Nadir.

Biography
He had two brothers — al-Rabi and Sallam. Kenana is said to have urged Muhammad to give up the custom during prayer of turning his face toward Mecca ("Qiblah") in favor of Jerusalem, as had been the custom in Islam at first. After the expulsion of the Banu al-Nadir, of which tribe he was a member, he and his family retired to Khaybar, where they possessed a castle called Qamus.

Ibn Ishaq writes about Kenana ibn al-Rabi: 
Kenana al-Rabi, who had the custody of the treasure of Banu Nadir, was brought to the apostle who asked him about it. He denied that he knew where it was. A Jew came (Tabari says "was brought"), to the apostle and said that he had seen Kenana going round a certain ruin every morning early. When the apostle said to Kenana, "Do you know that if we find you have it I shall kill you?" He said "Yes". The apostle gave orders that the ruin was to be excavated and some of the treasure was found. When he asked him about the rest he refused to produce it, so the apostle gave orders to al-Zubayr Al-Awwam, "Torture him until you extract what he has." So he kindled a fire with flint and steel on his chest until he was nearly dead. Then the apostle delivered him to Muhammad b. Maslama and he struck off his head, in revenge for his brother Mahmud

In addition to Ibn Ishaq's narration Al-Tabari writes:
The Prophet gave orders concerning Kenana to Zubayr, saying, ‘Torture him until you root out and extract what he has. So Zubayr kindled a fire on Kenana’s chest, twirling it with his firestick until Kenana was near death. Then the Messenger gave him to Maslamah, who beheaded him. -- Al-Tabari, Vol. 8, p. 122

Al-Mubarakpuri maintains that al-Rabi was bound by agreements between Muhammad and Khaybar to not conceal anything from the Muslims. He was executed, al-Mubarakpuri concludes, for breaching the agreement. Montgomery Watt supports the view that he was executed for concealing the treasure. Shibli Nomani, however, argues that Kenana was put to death because he had killed Mahmud, the brother of Muhammad bin Maslama. Nomani also casts doubt on the accuracy of the story due to its sources (see section below).

Reliability of Ibn Ishaq's Account
In hadith studies, ibn Isḥaq's hadith (considered separately from his prophetic biography) is generally thought to be "good" (ḥasan) (assuming an accurate and trustworthy isnad, or chain of transmission) and himself having a reputation of being "sincere" or "trustworthy" (ṣadūq).

See also
Ibn Ishaq
Banu Nadir
List of battles of Muhammad

Notes

Sources
Muhammad ibn Ismail al-Bukhari. Sahih Bukhari.
Gottheil, Richard et al. "Kenana". Jewish Encyclopedia. Funk and Wagnalls, 1901-1906.
Ibn Ishaq. The Life of Muhammad: A Translation of Ibn Ishaq's Sirat Rasul Allah. A. Guillaume, trans. Oxford Univ. Press, 1955.
Muslim ibn al-Hajjaj al-Qushayri. Sahih Muslim. Abdul Hamid Siddiqi, et al., transl's. revised ed. 2000.

Banu Nadir
7th-century Arabian Jews
People executed by decapitation
Opponents of Muhammad